Naka Vihara (Sinhalaː නඛා වෙහෙර) is a dagoba belonging to the late Anuradhapura period between 7-10 centuries C.E. and located in Anuradhapura, Sri Lanka. The dagoba has been built with bricks and square in shape. The site was constructed according to an unusual model and would have been similar to the seven story building Satmahal Prasadaya in Polonnaruwa, Sri Lanka. Excavations done at this location revealed several clay caskets.

References

Monuments and memorials in Sri Lanka
Stupas in Anuradhapura
Archaeological protected monuments in Anuradhapura District